Westonoceras is an extinct nautiloid genus from the Discosorida that lived during the Middle and Late Ordovician that has been found in North America, Greenland, and Northern Europe. It is the type genus for the Westonoceratidae

Description
The shell of Westonoceras forms a humped exogastric cyrtocone with its greatest height (gibbosity) at the anterior part of the mature phragmocone and posterior body chamber. The early juvenile portion is slender, gently exogastric or straight and rapidly increasing in size.  Curvature increases during development.  The dorsum, on the longitudinally concave side, is broadly rounded.  The venter, on the longitudinally convex side, is narrow.

The siphuncle is located close to the ventral wall. Segments are box-shaped and strongly expanded. Septal necks are strongly recumbent; connecting rings thick, with inflated bullettes.  Parietal deposits grow forward from the septal foremina, commonly forming a continuous internal lining.  Cameral deposits are common.

Phylogeny
Westonoceras is derived from Teichertoceras by loss of the initial endogastric curvature of the latter.  It have rise to Winnipegoceras in becoming more slender and compressed.

See also
 List of nautiloids

References

 Flower, R.H.and Teichert, C. 1957. The Cephalopod Order Discosorida. University of Kansas Paleontological Contributions, Mollusca, Article 6. July 1957
 Teichert, C 1964. Nautiloidea -Discosorida. Treatise on Invertebrate Paleontology Part K Geological Society of America. R.C. Moore, ed.
 Sepkoski, J.J. Jr. 2002. A compendium of fossil marine animal genera. D.J. Jablonski & M.L. Foote (eds.). Bulletins of American Paleontology 363: 1–560. Sepkoski's Online Genus Database (CEPHALOPODA)

Discosorida
Middle Ordovician first appearances
Late Ordovician extinctions
Paleozoic life of Manitoba
Paleozoic life of the Northwest Territories
Paleozoic life of Nunavut
Prehistoric nautiloid genera